Josephine Precious Orji (born 8 April 1979) is a Nigerian professional powerlifter. On 14 September 2016, she won gold in the women's +86kg category at the 2016 Summer Paralympics in Brazil before she went on to set a new world and Games record by lifting  at the same event.

Career 
Josephine developed a passion for powerlifting in 2001 after visiting a gym in Owerri and trying out the sport for the first time. Afterwards, she quit her job as a computer expert in a cyber café and commenced her training to develop a career in sport as a powerlifter.

References

1979 births
Living people
Medalists at the 2016 Summer Paralympics
Nigerian female weightlifters
Igbo sportspeople
Paralympic medalists in powerlifting
Paralympic gold medalists for Nigeria
Powerlifters at the 2016 Summer Paralympics
Paralympic powerlifters of Nigeria
Nigerian powerlifters
20th-century Nigerian women
21st-century Nigerian women